Faxonius stygocaneyi, the Caney Mountain cave crayfish, is a small, freshwater crayfish endemic to Missouri in the United States. It is a cave-dwelling species known from only one cave, Mud Cave in Ozark County, Missouri.

References

Cambaridae
Cave crayfish
Freshwater crustaceans of North America
Crustaceans described in 2001
Endemic fauna of Missouri
Taxobox binomials not recognized by IUCN